Mikavica is a hamlet and a bay on isle of Žirje in Croatia. It is connected by the D128 road.

Populated places in Šibenik-Knin County